Tikonko is a village in Bo District in the Southern Province of Sierra Leone. The Mende make up the largest ethnic group in the village.

Villages in Sierra Leone
Southern Province, Sierra Leone